Toyomichi Kurita (栗田 豊道 Kurita Toyomichi; born 1950) is a Japanese cinematographer who has worked in both Japan and the United States.

Kurita won the Independent Spirit Award for Best Cinematography for Trouble in Mind (1985) with two additional nominations for The Moderns (1988) and Powwow Highway (1989), and was nominated for a Japanese Academy Award for his work on Nagisa Oshima's 1999 film Taboo. He has collaborated with directors like Oshima, Alan Rudolph, Paul Schrader, Tyler Perry, Robert Altman, and Takashi Miike. He is an alumnus of the American Film Institute Conservatory.

Biography
Kurita graduated from the AFI Conservatory's cinematography program with a Master of Fine Arts in 1981.

Filmography

References

External links
 

1950 births
Japanese cinematographers
AFI Conservatory alumni
Independent Spirit Award winners
Living people